International Business District Station is a Line 1 subway station of the Incheon Subway in Yeonsu-gu, Incheon, South Korea. It is located in the Songdo International Business District.

History
The station was opened on June 1, 2009, by the opening of the Songdo International City Extension.

Station Layout

In popular culture
In 2012, the singer PSY 's Gangnam-style promotional video, which became a worldwide hit, captured some scenes at the station's platform.

References

Metro stations in Incheon
Seoul Metropolitan Subway stations
Railway stations opened in 2009
Yeonsu District